Cleveland Bridge & Engineering Company was a UK bridge works and structural steel contractor based in Darlington. It built landmarks including the Victoria Falls Bridge in Zimbabwe; the Tees Transporter Bridge; the Forth Road and Humber suspension bridges in the UK; Hong Kong's Tsing Ma Bridge, and London's Wembley Stadium Arch.

Cleveland Bridge's Dubai business fabricated and erected steel structures for the Burj Al Arab and Emirates Towers.

The Darlington company went into administration in July 2021, owing £21m, and closed in September 2021.

History
Cleveland Bridge & Engineering Company was founded in 1877 with a capital of £10,000. The assets were sold to Charles Frederick Dixon in 1885. He registered his company on a Stock Exchange in 1893 and by 1913 there were 600 staff.

In 1967, the company was acquired by The Cementation Company.

Trafalgar House bought Cementation in 1970 and went on to acquire Redpath Dorman Long from Dorman Long Group in 1982. It merged the two subsidiaries in 1990 as Cleveland Structural Engineering. That business was renamed Kvaerner Cleveland Bridge following acquisition of Trafalgar House by Kværner in 1996.

In 2000, the company, once again, became independent through an £8.3million ($12.3million) management buyout. Management also acquired the company's Dubai subsidiary that had been established in 1978. Saudi Arabia's Al Rushaid Group provided finance to the firm which rose to an 88.5% stake by September 2002.

Decline and fall

In July 2021, Cleveland Bridge sought further funding from Al Rushaid Group and warned 220 staff of potential redundancies. The firm was reported to be on the brink of administration after contract delays.

Al Rushaid Group did not provide the resources; administrator FRP was appointed, and the business was put up for sale. Fifty three workers were made redundant. Around 25 staff continued to assist FRP, and 128 staff were furloughed under the Coronavirus Jobs Retention Scheme pending restart of production.

FRP was unable to find a buyer for the business and on 10 September announced it would close with the loss of a further 133 jobs. They stated £12m would be required to fund the business to the end of 2021. The company assets were sold off in November 2021.

Controversies

2016 death and HSE fine

In 2022 Cleveland Bridge & Engineering was fined £1.5 million by the Health and Safety Executive, with a further cost judgement of £29,000 against them. An inadequately secured crane access panel gave way in a 2016 fatal fall. The fine related to four breaches of the Health and Safety at Work etc. Act 1974 leading to the death. FRP Advisory stated it was unlikely the fine or costs could be paid.

Shard delays

In 2013 Cleveland Bridge was ordered to pay Severfield-Rowen plc £824,478 compensation for delays to their subcontract work on The Shard. The judge accepted there was a very high incidence of poor workmanship in the steelwork Cleveland Bridge delivered. Cleveland Bridge's own internal correspondence highlighted an extraordinary work overload in 2010, and Judge Akenhead concluded it had taken on more work than it had capacity.

Wembley Stadium

In 2002 the company won a £60 million steelwork contract for the bowl of New Wembley Stadium. Part way through construction, relationships between main contractor Multiplex and Cleveland Bridge broke down. Multiplex stripped Cleveland Bridge of their erection role, handing it to roof steelwork contractor, Hollandia. Two hundred of Cleveland Bridge's on site erection staff and subcontractors transferred to Hollandia. They subsequently went on strike and were sacked. The situation escalated when Cleveland Bridge unilaterally repudiated its remaining stadium fabrication contract.

Both sides blamed the other for extra costs; delays; poor workmanship; missing or incorrect steelwork; damaged, missing or incorrect paintwork, and the chaotic state of records and the near site stock yards. Extensive litigation ensued and Cleveland Bridge was ultimately ordered to pay Multiplex £6,154,246.79 in respect of net earlier overpayments; breach of contract, and interest. Cleveland Bridge was also ordered to pay 20% of Multiplex's legal costs.

It was claimed, in evidence, that some Wembley steelwork had been fabricated in China for Cleveland Bridge and that it had ended up being diverted to the Beijing National Stadium.

Mr Justice Jackson's 2008 judgement in the Technology and Construction Court was highly critical of both parties unwillingness to settle earlier in such an expensive case where the core evidence extended to over 500 lever arch files, and photocopying costs alone were £1 million. He highlighted the large number of items at dispute where the sums involved were substantially exceeded by the legal costs involved in resolving them.

Notable bridges

See also

References

External links
 
 A to Z of bridges built by Cleveland Bridge

Bridge companies
Construction and civil engineering companies of England
Companies based in County Durham
Construction and civil engineering companies established in 1877
Manufacturing companies established in 1877
1877 establishments in England
Borough of Darlington
Structural steel
British companies established in 1877
2021 disestablishments in England
British companies disestablished in 2021